Sam Dastor is an Indian-born British actor best known for his appearances in British television series.

Life and career
Dastor was born in India and raised in a Parsi family of Zoroastrian faith, though he later converted to Christianity. He graduated from the University of Cambridge. He studied at the Royal Academy of Dramatic Art (RADA) and joined the National Theatre, where he was under the direction of Sir Laurence Olivier.

Dastor has acted in the West End, including playing Ariel in a production of The Tempest while Paul Scofield played Prospero. Dastor also appeared in three of Simon Gray's plays: Melon, Hidden Laughter, and Cell Mates.

Dastor is best known for his many appearances on British television, often playing characters of exotic origin. His most notable roles include Cassius Chaerea in the 1976 BBC adaptation of I, Claudius and Gandhi in both Lord Mountbatten: The Last Viceroy and the film Jinnah. Other credits include Softly, Softly, Space: 1999, Blake's 7, Shoestring, Yes Minister, Fortunes of War, A Touch of Frost and Spooks.
 
He has also narrated and voice-acted for a number of audiobooks and radio dramas.

Partial filmography
Made (1972) – Mahdav
Jinnah (1998) – Gandhi
Such a Long Journey (1998) – Dinshawji
The Life and Death of Peter Sellers (2004) – Hal Ashby

References

External links
 

20th-century British male actors
21st-century British male actors
British male actors of Indian descent
Alumni of RADA
Alumni of the University of Cambridge
Audiobook narrators
British male film actors
British male stage actors
British male television actors
British male voice actors
Converts to Christianity from Zoroastrianism
Indian emigrants to England
Living people
Year of birth missing (living people)